Raphael Woolf is a British philosopher and Professor in the Department of Philosophy at King's College London.
He is known for his expertise on ancient Greek and Roman philosophy.

Books
 Cicero: The Philosophy of a Roman Sceptic, Routledge, 2015
 Rereading Ancient Philosophy: Old Chestnuts and Sacred Cows, edited by Verity Harte and Raphael Woolf, Cambridge University Press, 2018
 Aristotle: Eudemian Ethics, edited by Brad Inwood and Raphael Woolf, Cambridge University Press, 2013

References

External links
Raphael Woolf at KCL
Raphael Woolf on Cicero

21st-century British philosophers
Philosophy academics
Living people
Academics of King's College London
Alumni of the University of Cambridge
Alumni of King's College London
British scholars of ancient Greek philosophy
Scholars of ancient Roman philosophy
Date of birth missing (living people)
Year of birth missing (living people)